The 2013 Women's Premier League Rugby season was the fifth season of the Women's Premier League in the United States. It began on September 8 and involved eight teams.

Format 
The Keystone Rugby Club were relegated in the off-season and the Atlanta Harlequins had their first year as a part of the WPL. The eight teams were divided into two conferences, Red and Blue, comprising four teams. They each played six conference games, one home and one away. The WPL season occurred in the fall, concurrently with the regular women's club season, with the National Championship being held in November 8–10.

For the Finals, teams were seeded based on the results of their conference during the regular season. The top four teams competed for the Cup and the bottom teams for the Bowl.

Conference standings

Blue Conference

Red Conference

Matches

Week 1

Week 2

Week 3

Week 4

Week 5

Week 6

Playoffs

Bowl Semifinals

Cup Semifinals

Bowl Finals

7th Place Final

5th Place Final

Cup Finals

3rd Place Final

Grand Final

References

External links 

 USA Rugby Women's Premier League official site

Women's Premier League
Women's Premier League